LtrA is an open reading frame found in the Lactococcus lactis group II introns LtrB.  It is an intron-encoded protein, which consists of three subdomains: a reverse-transcriptase/maturase, DNA endonuclease, and DNA/RNA binding domain. LtrA helps to capture and stabilize the catalytically active conformation of the LtrB group II intron RNA.  It also functions in group II intron retrohoming.

References 

Prokaryote genes